Leon Bass (January 23, 1925 – March 28, 2015) was an educator from Philadelphia.  He is noted as an African-American soldier in World War II who witnessed the Buchenwald concentration camp.

Life
Bass was born and grew up in Philadelphia, one of six children (Henry Jr., Claude, Harvey, Marcellus, and sister, Willie Belle). His father, Henry Bass, was a Pullman porter, and his mother, Nancy Weston Bass was a housewife who had both emigrated to West Philadelphia from Bennettsville, South Carolina.

World War II Service
He volunteered for the US Army during World War II, trained in Alabama and Florida, and served in the 183rd Engineer Combat Battalion, a segregated unit. As a black soldier, he experienced  the oppression and humiliation of being a second class citizen in his own Army. His unit was involved in the Battle of the Bulge.

In April 1945, 183rd Engineer Combat Battalion was designated to be attached to the 1126th Engineer Combat Group.  On April 11, 1945, Bass, then a Sergeant, and another member of the 183rd, Sgt. William A. Scott III, arrived at the headquarters of the 1126th in a forward liaison capacity.  The next day, they convoyed with members of the 1126th to the town of Eisenach, approximately 100 kilometers from the Buchenwald camp, which had been discovered by allied troops the previous day. After arriving at Eisenach, Bass and others were detailed to Buchenwald to assist in relief, and were among the first American soldiers to be seen by survivors of the camp.  Bass later referred to the people he saw that day as "the walking dead".

Teaching
After the war, Bass graduated from West Chester University of Pennsylvania and then studied at Temple University where he received a Doctorate.  He became a teacher at the Benjamin Franklin High School in Philadelphia, eventually becoming its principal, a position he served in until 1981. He later taught history at George School, a Quaker boarding school in Newtown, Pennsylvania.

He was a speaker on the subject of racism and The Holocaust, and had lectured extensively on the subject, bringing his unique perspective as a witness of many forms of oppression.

He was a participant in the International Liberators Conference, held in Washington DC in 1981. In 1994 he was the keynote speaker at the Georgia Commission on the Holocaust, and in 1996 he was awarded the Pearlman Award for Humanitarian Advancement from Jewish Women International.

He appeared in the Academy Award-nominated Documentary "Liberators: Fighting on Two Fronts in World War II". An oral history interview with Bass is in the Fortunoff Video Archive for Holocaust Testimonies at Yale University, and was also adapted into a podcast episode for "Those Who Were There: Voices from the Holocaust." He died at the age of 90 in 2015.

References

1925 births
2015 deaths
Educators from Philadelphia
United States Army personnel of World War II
West Chester University alumni
Temple University alumni
United States Army soldiers